Bukit Tunku is an upper-class residential area in Kuala Lumpur, Malaysia. It was formerly known as Bukit Kenny or Kenny Hills. Bukit Tunku hosts many luxury condominiums and villas and is surrounded by many housing projects. Houses in Bukit Tunku regularly sell for up to RM 6 million on an  land area and a  built-up.

Education

The Asia School of Business is located in Bukit Tunku, with its new campus being constructed on a 30-acre plot of land located by the headquarters of Bank Negara Malaysia. The French School of Kuala Lumpur moved to Bukit Tunku in 1983. In 2005 it moved again into its current campus in Segambut.

References

External links
 Bukit Tunku Residents Association

 

Suburbs in Kuala Lumpur